The Massachusetts Bay Transportation Authority uses a number of yards and facilities for maintenance and storage of its road and rail fleets.

Active yards

Bus

Many of these facilities are former streetcar carhouses that were gradually converted to trackless trolley and bus use, although some like Southampton (built 2004) are of recent construction. Of the former streetcar carhouses, only Arborway and Watertown were Green Line yards during part of the MBTA era. Everett was an Orange Line yard until 1975.

Subway

The subway lines each have one maintenance facility (except for three on the Green Line) and often several other yards used for overnight and midday storage.

Commuter rail
All MBTA Commuter Rail lines except the Lowell Line have a dedicated layover near the end of the line
|trainsets to be stored overnight. Some provide ground power and other facilities; others are simply several yard tracks off the mainline. The MBTA has one heavy maintenance facility on the northside, plus two light maintenance facilities on the southside. Equipment is transferred between the two sides via the Grand Junction Railroad.

Future yards

Former yards

References

External links

Railway workshops in the United States
Massachusetts Bay Transportation Authority